Extrapulmonary tuberculosis is tuberculosis (TB) within a location in the body other than the lungs. It accounts for an increasing fraction of active cases, from 20 to 40% according to published reports, and causes other kinds of TB. These are collectively denoted as "extrapulmonary tuberculosis". Extrapulmonary TB occurs more commonly in immunosuppressed persons and young children. In those with HIV, this occurs in more than 50% of cases. Notable extrapulmonary infection sites include the pleura (in tuberculous pleurisy), the central nervous system (in tuberculous meningitis), the lymphatic system (in scrofula of the neck), the genitourinary system (in urogenital tuberculosis), and the bones and joints (in Pott disease of the spine), among others.

Infection of the lymph nodes, known as tubercular lymphadenitis, is the most common extrapulmonary form of tuberculosis. An ulcer originating from nearby infected lymph nodes may occur and is painless. It typically enlarges slowly and has an appearance of "wash leather".

 When it spreads to the bones, it is known as skeletal tuberculosis, a form of osteomyelitis. Tuberculosis has been present in humans since ancient times.

Central nervous system infections include tuberculous meningitis, intracranial tuberculomas, and spinal tuberculous arachnoiditis.

Gastrointestinal 

Abdominal infections include gastrointestinal tuberculosis (which is important to distinguish from Crohn's disease, since immunosuppressive therapy used for the latter can lead to dissemination), tuberculous peritonitis, and genitourinary tuberculosis.

A potentially more serious, widespread form of TB is called "disseminated tuberculosis", also known as miliary tuberculosis. Miliary TB currently makes up about 10% of extrapulmonary cases.

Pleural effusion
This condition is one of the common forms of extrapulmonary tuberculosis. It occurs during acute phase of the disease, with fever, cough, and pain while breathing (pleurisy). Pleural fluid usually contains mostly lymphocytes and the Mycobacterium bacteria. Gold standard of diagnosis is the detection of Mycobacterium in pleural fluid. Other diagnostic test includes the detection of adenosine deaminase (above 40 U/L) and interferon gamma in pleural fluid.

References

Tuberculosis